Tasila Mwale (born c. 1984) is a Zambian singer-songwriter.

According to Mwale's own account, she started her singing career at  an early age. She was an active member of the Scripture Union singing group at her school.

Tasila first came to the public eye when she won the Zambian version of the Pop Idol competition, 'MNet Idols Zambia'.

As an award for her performance, she signed a one record recording contract with Zambian music label Mondo Music Corporation. The result was her debut album Uchi (meaning "honey"). This album featured collaborations with several established Zambian musicians including Ballard Zulu, Joe Chibangu, and Black Muntu.

After the yearlong contract with Mondo Music, Tasila took a break from full time music to pursue her studies. She continued to be part of the industry, however, by lending her soul-ful vocals to hits by Ty2, Ruff Kid and Cq Muzukulu. She also showcased her writing skills by penning songs for Celtel Star Search winners Viola and T.R.
In March 2013, Tasila stepped back into the spotlight; releasing the hit single Ready for Love. It received generous airplay and became a top 10 song on the local music charts.
2014 saw the release of Tasila’s 10 track album called Malizu which won the prestigious Zambian Music Awards 2015 for Best Traditional Music album. The album is a re-imagining of traditional Zambian folk songs and is led by four singles Shekala ku Mutima, Ndafunafuna, Mulume Wankene & Amama(Emeli) whose videos are available on YouTube.
Nili Chabe Bwino is the title track of Tasila’s October 2020 album. Soulful vocals and thoughtful writing are showcased on a beautifully put together piece of art that boasts tracks like I Love You, So...Lelo and Ndiwe Mukazi.}

In 2022 Tasila took part in an artist residency called FABRIC-ated STORIES organised by the Women's History Museum of Zambia. She produced two songs from the residency, namely Takulandilani and Nshingini. Fabricated Stories was an eight week multimedia residency which was geared towards (re)creating an array of dynamic cultural material directly inspired by the Shared Histories object archive. The Shared Histories archive is a collaborative archival project composed of ethnographic and cultural material that has its provenance in different regions of Zambia. Each artist was given access to the collection from which they each selected objects to research and incorporate into the development of a new body of work. The objects selected included photographic material, celebratory masks, bronze clubs and more. The work galvanised during the residency was part of a group show in which the artists had their work showcased. The exhibition was launched with a lavish event at the Lusaka Museum.

References

21st-century Zambian women singers
1984 births
Living people
Zambian evangelicals
People from Lusaka

https://www.whmzambia.org/news/2022/1/18/fabricated-stories-residency?rq=fabricated